The House with the Golden Windows is a lost 1916 American drama silent film directed by George Melford and written by Charles Sarver. The film stars Wallace Reid, Cleo Ridgely, Billy Jacobs, James Neill, Mabel Van Buren, and Marjorie Daw. The film was released on August 10, 1916, by Paramount Pictures.

Plot
The wife of a poor shepherd named Sue Wells (Cleo Ridgely) is tired of being poor and takes advantage of a loophole to become owners of her neighbor's rich estate while her neighbor is gone. However, living in the mansion doesn't make Sue happy. When their neighbor comes home to find out what they have done he kills her husband. Right before he can kill her, she wakes up and realizes it was all a dream. Her husband then walks in and tells her that he got a job as that estate's overseer, so they won't have to worry about money anymore.

Cast 
Wallace Reid as Tom Wells
Cleo Ridgely as Sue Wells
Billy Jacobs as Billy Wells
James Neill as James Peabody
Mabel Van Buren as Mrs. Peabody
Marjorie Daw as A Fairy
Bob Fleming as Peabody's Overseer

References

External links 

1916 films
1910s English-language films
Silent American drama films
1916 drama films
Paramount Pictures films
Films directed by George Melford
American black-and-white films
American silent feature films
Lost American films
1916 lost films
Lost drama films
1910s American films